Zila School Chapra is a high school in the Chapra district of Bihar, India. The school was established in 1839, and hosts students in grades 9 to 12. It is affiliated with the Bihar School Examination Board, Patna.

Notable graduates include the first president of India, Rajendra Prasad, who completed his education there.

Notable alumni

 Rajendra Prasad, first president of India

References

Educational institutions established in the 19th century
1854 establishments in India
Schools in Bihar